Lasiothyris subdiclada is a species of moth of the family Tortricidae. It is found in Brazil in the states of Bahia and Minas Gerais.

The wingspan is about 9 mm. The ground colour of the forewings is pearl creamy with yellowish-brown suffusions and slightly darker markings. The hindwings are pale brownish creamy.

References

Moths described in 2002
Cochylini